Austin City Hall is the seat of Austin municipal government, located at 301 W 2nd St in downtown Austin, Texas (USA). The current building was completed in 2004. It is the meeting place for the Austin City Council.

Description
The current building was designed by Antoine Predock and Cotera + Reed Architects, which was intended to reflect what The Dallas Morning News referred to as a “crazy-quilt vitality, that embraces everything from country music to environmental protests and high-tech swagger.” The new city hall, built from recycled materials, has solar panels in its garage.

History
Austin formerly operated its City Hall at 124 West 8th Street. In the 1980s, the City of Austin proposed a 60-acre urban renewal project for Austin's Warehouse District, which would have included a new city hall complex designed by urban planner Denise Scott Brown, along with a new location for the Laguna Gloria art museum, designed by architect Robert Venturi. In 1987, partially in response to the Savings and Loan Crisis, the plans were shelved when the property was foreclosed upon.

In 1999, Mayor Kirk Watson and the Austin City Council approved a $10.4 million tax incentive for the Computer Sciences Corporation (CSC) to construct a three-building complex on the same site slated for the failed city hall complex, under the stipulation that CSC funded the construction of a new city hall. The first two buildings (now home to Silicon Labs) were constructed before CSC vacated the premises before following through with the construction of the city hall building. 

In November 2004, the Austin City Hall officially opened in its current building at 301 W 2nd St.

References

External links

 

Buildings and structures in Austin, Texas
City halls in Texas
Government buildings completed in 2004
Government of Austin, Texas
Modernist architecture in Texas